see also Highmoor (disambiguation)

Highmoor is a family name with historic links to the similar name of Highmore

Traditionally, Highmoors/Highmores have been known to inhabit the English side of the England-Scotland border regions.

The family crests feature either 3 or 4 moorcocks sable, beaked and membered gules with later variations to the same.

The Highmoor/Highmore family can be divided into seven groups of which five left or had subgroups leave England.

Group One is the original group which lived in Cumberland, now Cumbria, England. This original group includes the Highmores who resided at Armathwaite Hall. Many have moved to other parts of the UK including Devonshire and Dorset.
Group Two is the Dorset group, from whom emerged the Newfoundland Highmore family. Others remained in Dorset with some moving to London, England.
Group Three is the Newfoundland group, who migrated to Canada. 
Group Four is the Australian group, who migrated to Australia directly from Cumberland, England. 
Group Five is the Rochester Group, who migrated to the Rochester, New York area directly from Cumberland, England.
Group Six is the Great Musgrave Group. This group moved south into Westmorland, Yorkshire and Norfolk with some eventually migrating to Canada. 
Group Seven is the Empress Group which emigrated from Cumberland to Western Canada. The groups also roughly correspond to time periods, although most if not all of these groups still have living descendants.

The earliest known Highmoor/Highmore is Robertus de Hehmor (d. 1275) who is memorialised at St. Bega's Church on Bassenthwaite Lake, not far from the site of Armathwaite Hall.

References

'Moorcocks Sable' by Christopher Russell Highmore [Published in 2013] 

Surnames